The Eastern District is one of the 18 districts of Hong Kong. It had a population of 588,094 in 2011. The district has the second highest population while its residents have the third highest median household income among 18 districts.

Geography 
It is located in the north-eastern part of the Hong Kong Island and includes the areas of Fortress Hill, North Point, Braemar Hill, Quarry Bay, Tai Koo Shing, Sai Wan Ho, Shau Kei Wan, Heng Fa Chuen, Chai Wan and Siu Sai Wan.

The eastern portion of Causeway Bay and Tin Hau were once in Eastern District. They were moved to Wan Chai District in the new year day of 2016.

History 
Originally a backwater of fishing villages, quarries and dockyards, there are archaeological evidence there were villages and small towns appeared during the Song Dynasty (AD 960–1279).

The Eastern District is now mostly residential, with some industrial areas and several large shopping malls. While mostly Home Ownership Scheme and public housing estates are located from Sai Wan Ho to Chai Wan, large private housing estates are also located within the eastern district, such as Taikoo Shing, Kornhill and Heng Fa Chuen. A commercial hub has been developed from the former industrial areas in western part of Quarry Bay. Hotels and commercial buildings are also developed near Fortress Hill along the coast.

In the past the district was linked by a single traffic artery, King's Road, which was notoriously congested during peak hours. This was largely resolved by the construction of the Island Eastern Corridor and the Island line within the MTR rapid transit system in the 1980s. It also contains the tram line, now over 100 years old, that runs near the sea shore from Shau Kei Wan west towards other districts.

See also 
 List of places in Hong Kong

References

External links

 Eastern District Council
 List and map of electoral constituencies (large PDF file)

 
Districts of Hong Kong
Hong Kong Island